In Greek mythology, Nerites was a minor sea deity, the son of "Old Man of the Sea" Nereus and the Oceanid Doris and brother of the fifty Nereids (apparently their only male sibling). He was described as a young boy of stunning beauty. According to Aelian, Nerites was never mentioned by epic poets such as Homer and Hesiod, but was a common figure in the mariners' folklore.

Etymology 
According to Aristoteles, the name nerites refers to many species of sea snails. R. S. P. Beekes suggests a Pre-Greek origin for the word.

Mythology 
Aelian cites two versions of the myth concerning Nerites, which are as follows:

In the first version, Aphrodite, before her ascension from the sea to Olympus, fell in love with Nerites. When the time had come for her to join the Olympian gods, she wanted Nerites to go with her, but he refused, preferring to stay with his family in the sea. Even the fact that Aphrodite promised him a pair of wings did not make him change his mind. The scorned goddess then transformed him into a shellfish and gave the wings to her son Eros.

In the second version, Nerites was loved by Poseidon and answered his feelings. Their love was the origin of mutual love (Anteros). Poseidon also made Nerites his charioteer; the boy drove the chariot astonishingly fast, to the admiration of various sea creatures. Helios, for reasons unknown to Aelian's sources, changed Nerites into a shellfish; the narrative of the love-story is disrupted by Helios who is resentful of the boy's speed, but with no explanation behind it, allowing Aelian to conjecture that the two gods were rivals in love and Helios might have wanted the boy's affections for himself and was offended by his refusal.

See also 
 Adonis
 Ganymede
 Pelops
 Phaethon
 Greek sea gods

Notes

References 
 Claudius Aelianus, On the Characteristics of Animals, translated by Alwyn Faber Scholfield (1884-1969), from Aelian, Characteristics of Animals, published in three volumes by Harvard/Heinemann, Loeb Classical Library, 1958. Online version at the Topos Text Project.
 Claudius Aelianus, De Natura Animalium, Latin translation by Friedrich Jacobs in the Frommann edition, Jena, 1832. Latin translation available at Bill Thayer's Web Site
 Claudius Aelianus, De Natura Animalium, Rudolf Hercher. Lipsiae, in aedibus B. G. Teubneri, 1864.  Greek text available at the Perseus Digital Library.
 Grimal, Pierre, The Dictionary of Classical Mythology, Wiley-Blackwell, 1996. .

External links 
 NERITES on The Theoi Project

LGBT themes in Greek mythology
Greek sea gods
Homosexuality and bisexuality deities
Sea and river gods
Metamorphoses into arthropods in Greek mythology
Consorts of Aphrodite
Men of Poseidon
Deeds of Poseidon
Helios in mythology
Deeds of Aphrodite